The Servant of Two Masters is a comedy by the Italian playwright Carlo Goldoni written in 1746. Goldoni originally wrote the play at the request of actor Antonio Sacco, one of the great Harlequins in history. His earliest drafts had large sections that were reserved for improvisation, but he revised it in 1789 in the version that exists today. The play draws on the tradition of the earlier Italian commedia dell'arte.

Plot
The play opens with the introduction of Beatrice, a woman who has traveled to Venice disguised as her dead brother in search of the man who killed him, Florindo, who is also her lover. Her brother forbade her to marry Florindo, and died defending his sister's honor. Beatrice disguises herself as Federigo (her dead brother) so that he can collect dowry money from Pantaloon (also spelled Pantalone), the father of Clarice, her brother's betrothed. She wants to use this money to help her lover escape, and to allow them to finally wed. But thinking that Beatrice's brother was dead, Clarice has fallen in love with another man, Silvio, and the two have become engaged. Interested in keeping up appearances, Pantalone tries to conceal the presence of Federigo and Silvio from one another.

Beatrice's servant, the exceptionally quirky and comical Harlequin (known in English also as Truffaldino, which can be translated into English as Fraudolent), is the central figure of this play. He is always complaining of an empty stomach, and always trying to satisfy his hunger by eating everything and anything in sight. When the opportunity presents itself to be servant to another master (Florindo, as it happens) he sees the opportunity for an extra dinner.

As Harlequin runs around Venice trying to fill the orders of two masters, he is almost uncovered several times, especially because other characters repeatedly hand him letters, money, etc. and say simply "this is for your master" without specifying which one. To make matters worse, the stress causes him to develop a temporary stutter, which only arouses more problems and suspicion among his masters. To further complicate matters, Beatrice and Florindo are staying in the same hotel, and are searching for each other.

In the end, with the help of Clarice and Smeraldina (Pantalone's feisty servant, who is smitten with Truffaldino), Beatrice and Florindo finally find each other, and with Beatrice exposed as a woman, Clarice is allowed to marry Silvio.  The last matter up for discussion is whether Harlequin and Smeraldina can get married, which at last exposes Harlequin's having played both sides all along. However, as everyone has just decided to get married, Harlequin is forgiven. Harlequin asks Smeraldina to marry him.

The most famous set-piece of the play is the scene in which the starving Harlequin tries to serve a banquet to the entourages of both his masters without either group becoming aware of the other, while desperately trying to satisfy his own hunger at the same time.

Characterization
The characters of the play are taken from the Italian Renaissance theatre style commedia dell'arte. In classic commedia tradition, an actor learns a stock character (usually accentuated by a mask) and plays it to perfection throughout his career. The actors had a list of possible scenarios, each with a very basic plot, called a canovaccio, and throughout would perform physical-comedy acts known as lazzi (from Italian lazzo, a joke or witticism) and the dialogue was improvised.

Characters

The characters from The Servant of Two Masters are derived from stock characters used in commedia dell'arte. True commedia dell'arte is more or less improvised without a script, so The Servant of Two Masters is not true commedia. The stock characters were used as guides for the actors improvising.

 Truffaldino Battochio  Servant first to Beatrice, and afterward to Florindo. He is the love interest of Smeraldina (based on Arlecchino).
 Beatrice Rasponi  Master to Truffaldino, a lady of Turin and disguised as her brother Federigo Rasponi. She is the love interest of Florindo.
 Florindo Aretusi  Master to Truffaldino, of Turin and the love interest of Beatrice (an innamorati character who truly loves Beatrice)
 Pantalone Dei Bisognosi  A Venetian merchant (based on Pantalone)
 Smeraldina  Maidservant to Clarice and the love interest of Truffaldino (based on Columbina)
 Clarice  Pantalone's Daughter and the love interest of Silvio (based on Isabella)
 Silvio  Son of Dr. Lombardi and the love interest of Clarice (based on Flavio)
 Dr. Lombardi  Silvio's father (based on Il Dottore)
 Brighella  An Innkeeper
 First Waiter
 Second Waiter
 First Porter
 Second Porter

Adaptations
There have been several adaptations of the play for the cinema and for the stage:
Слуга двух господ (Sluga dvukh gospod [Servant of Two Masters]) (1953) – a 1953 Soviet adaptation
Slugă la doi stăpâni (1956) – a Romanian National Radiophonic Theater production; translation: Polixenia Carambi; artistic director: Constantin Moruzan
The Servant o' Twa Maisters (1965) Scots language adaptation by Victor Carin
Servant of Two Masters (1966) opera by Vittorio Giannini
Harlekijn, kies je meester (1973) (TV) – Dutch adaptation
Truffaldino from Bergamo (1976) (TV) – Soviet TV movie adaptation
Servant of Two Masters (1978) Australian adaptation by Ron Blair and Nick Enright Later produced for television and frequently revived in Australia
Sluha dvou pánů (Servant of Two Masters) (1994-2016), Czech theatrical adaptation in National Theatre, Prague; main role played by Miroslav Donutil
Servant of Two Masters(1992) Directed by Irene Lewis; Baltimore Center Stage 
A Servant to Two Masters (1999) Adapted by Lee Hall
The Servant of Two Masters (2004) Translated and adapted by Jeffrey Hatcher and Paolo Emilio Landi, first performed by Milwaukee Repertory Theater
The Man With Two Gaffers  (2006) Adapted by Blake Morrison, set in Victorian Skipton. First performed at York Theatre Royal 26 August 2006 by Northern Broadsides, directed by Barrie Rutter.
One Man, Two Guvnors (2011) – set in 1960s Brighton, adapted by Richard Bean and first performed at The National Theatre, London
Servant of Two Masters (2012) – adapted by Constance Congdon and first performed at The Lansburgh Theatre, Washington, D.C.
Servant of Two Masters Bengali adaptation by Ashim Das as 'Nawkar Shoytaan Malik Hoyraan' and stage production produced by FAME under the direction of Ashim Das in Bangladesh.

Notes

References
 Banham, Martin, ed. 1998. The Cambridge Guide to Theatre. Cambridge: Cambridge University Press. .
 Goldoni, Carlo. 2011. Il servitore di due padroni, . .

External links
The Servant of Two Masters, translated with an introduction by Edward J. Dent, Cambridge University Press, 1928; via Project Gutenberg
Il servitore di due padroni, acts and scenes in subpages, with statistics and concordance; PDF (231 KB)
Study notes, enotes.com

1746 plays
Plays by Carlo Goldoni
Comedy plays